Round and Around may refer to:

 "Round and Around" (Jaki Graham song), 1985
 "Round and Around" (Pink Floyd song), 1987
 "Round and Around", a song by Simian from Chemistry Is What We Are
 "Round and Around" (Magnum, P.I.), an episode of Magnum, P.I.

See also
 "Around and Around", a 1958 song by Chuck Berry
 Round and Round (disambiguation)